Valtonera (before 1928: Κάτω Νεβόλιανη - Kato Nevoliani) is a small village in the region of Florina, northern Greece. According to the 2011 Greek census the village had 232 inhabitants. The village is located in the small plain of the municipality of Amyntaio.

Demographics 
The Greek census (1920) recorded 171 people in the village and in 1923 there were 171 inhabitants (or 33 families) who were Muslim. Following the Greek-Turkish population exchange, in 1926 within Kato Nevoliani there were 54 refugee families from the Caucasus. The Greek census (1928) recorded 219 village inhabitants. There were 54 refugee families (168 people) in 1928.

Valtonera had 358 inhabitants in 1981. In fieldwork done by Riki Van Boeschoten in late 1993, Valtonera was populated by a Greek population descended from Anatolian Greek refugees who arrived during the population exchange, Slavophones and Aromanians. Pontic Greek was spoken in the village by people over 30 in public and private settings. Children understood the language, but mostly did not use it.

Culture
The Association «Proodos» (Progress) was founded by the residents of the village in 1981, while the sports club «Thyella» (Storm) is based in the village. The church of the village which holds an annual festival on 21 May is dedicated to Saints Constantine and Helena.

In 2003 Dimitra Koutsouridou of Valtonera entered the Guinness World Records, gathering a total of 8.514 pencil sharpeners, which are located and exhibited at the Elementary School of the village.

References 

Populated places in Florina (regional unit)
Amyntaio